Matilde Marcolli is an Italian and American mathematical physicist. She has conducted research work in areas of mathematics and theoretical physics; obtained the Heinz Maier-Leibnitz-Preis of the Deutsche Forschungsgemeinschaft, and the Sofia Kovalevskaya Award of the Alexander von Humboldt Foundation. Marcolli has authored and edited numerous books in the field.  She is currently the Robert F. Christy Professor of Mathematics and Computing and Mathematical Sciences at the California Institute of Technology.

Career 

Marcolli obtained her Laurea in Physics in 1993 summa cum laude from the University of Milan under the supervision of Renzo Piccinini, with a thesis on Classes of self equivalences of fibre bundles. She moved to the USA in 1994, where she obtained a master's degree (1994) and a PhD (1997) in Mathematics  from the University of Chicago, under the supervision of Melvin Rothenberg, with a thesis on Three dimensional aspects of Seiberg-Witten Gauge Theory. Between 1997 and 2000 she worked at the Massachusetts Institute of Technology (MIT) as a C.L.E. Moore instructor in the Department of Mathematics.

Between 2000 and 2010 she held a C3 position (German equivalent of associate professor) at the Max Planck Institute for Mathematics in Bonn and held an associate professor position (courtesy) at Florida State University in Tallahassee. She also held an honorary professorship at the  University of Bonn.  From 2008 to 2017 she was a full professor of Mathematics in the Division of Physics, Mathematics and Astronomy of the California Institute of Technology.  Between 2018 and 2020 she was a professor in the mathematics department of the University of Toronto and a member of the Perimeter Institute. She is currently the Robert F. Christy Professor of Mathematics and Computing and Mathematical Sciences at the California Institute of Technology.

She held visiting positions at the Tata Institute of Fundamental Research in Mumbai, the Kavli Institute for Theoretical Physics in Santa Barbara, the Mittag-Leffler Institute in Stockholm, the Isaac Newton Institute in Cambridge, and the Mathematical Sciences Research Institute in Berkeley, California.

Research 
Marcolli's research work has covered different areas of mathematics and theoretical physics: gauge theory and low-dimensional topology, algebraic-geometric structures in quantum field theory, noncommutative geometry with applications to number theory and to physics models, especially related to particle physics, quantum gravity and cosmology, and to the quantum Hall effect.

She has collaborated with several other mathematicians and physicists, among them Yuri I. Manin and Alain Connes. Twenty six graduate students obtained their PhD under her supervision between 2006 and 2022.

Honors and awards 

In 2001 she obtained the Heinz Maier-Leibnitz-Preis of the Deutsche Forschungsgemeinschaft (DFG) and in 2002 the Sofia Kovalevskaya Award of the Alexander von Humboldt Foundation. She was a plenary speaker in the 2008 European Congress of Mathematics in Amsterdam (with a talk on Renormalization, Galois symmetries and motives) and an invited speaker of the 2010 International Congress of Mathematicians in Hyderabad (with a talk on Noncommutative Geometry and Arithmetic).

Books authored

Books edited

References 
Citations

Sources

External links 

Homepage at Caltech
Homepage at FSU
Papers on the eprints ArXiv

Florida State University faculty
Living people
1969 births
Italian mathematicians
Italian women physicists
Italian women scientists
University of Milan alumni
University of Chicago alumni
Massachusetts Institute of Technology School of Science faculty
Women mathematicians